Yoel Halpern (19046 September 1983) was the rabbi of Jasło, Poland prior to the Holocaust. After the Holocaust, he was one of the rabbis of Bergen-Belsen and of the British Occupation Zone in Germany. After emigrating to the United States he was a rabbi in Brooklyn, New York.

Biography
Rabbi Yoel Halpern was born in Kraków in 1904. His father Rabbi Mattisyahu Chaim was the rabbi of Dobczyce.

Rabbi Halpern received his rabbinical ordination from rabbi Shmuel Engel of Radomshile.

Jasło 
When he came of age, Halpern married Dina, the daughter of rabbi Elimelech Rubin who was the rabbi of Jasło. After marriage, Halpern founded a yeshiva and a bais yaakov in Jasło. Subsequently,  Halpern was appointed Rabbi of Jasło.

During the Holocaust
When World War II began, Rabbi Halpern attempted to flee the Nazis but he was arrested by the Russians while crossing the border. When he was released from prison, he moved to Bukhara where he was a spiritual advisor to his fellow refugees.

Leadership roles in Germany

Rabbi of Bergen-Belsen and of the British Occupation Zone in Germany

After World War II ended, Halpern moved to Bergen-Belsen, where was appointed as rabbi. He officiated over 1,800 weddings of Holocaust survivors and circumcised more than 1,500 boys. He also permitted hundreds of agunot to remarry.

Leader of the "Vaad Harabanim of the British Zone"
Rabbi Halpern was the founder and leader of the "Vaad Harabanim (council of Rabbis) of the British Zone". The Vaad consisted of many notable Rabbis in the British zone, including Rabbi Chaim Pinchas Lubinsky (Hannover), Rabbi Shlomo Zev Zweigenhaft (Hannover), Rabbi Yisroel Aryeh Zalmanowitz (Bergen-Belsen), Rabbi Yisroel Moshe Olewski (Celle)., Rabbi Yissocher Berish Rubin (Bergen-Belsen) and Rabbi Yitzchak Glickman (Bergen-Belsen). On several occasions the Vaad formed a bais din in Hannover and in other smaller communities in the zone.

In the United States

In 1949, the British occupation of North-West Germany ended and the British Chief Rabbi's Religious Emergency Council and it's appointees were required to wrap up their operations in Germany. Halpern then emigrated to the United States. He settled in Brownsville and where he was the Rabbi of a synagogue. Later he moved to Boro Park where he was a rabbi and the leader "Merkaz Chinuch Hatorah" (Center for Torah Education).

Rabbi Halpern died on 6 September 1983.

Family
Halpern's wife Dina and their three children were not able to escape when the Nazis invaded Poland and were murdered in the Holocaust.

References

Polish Orthodox rabbis
Polish Holocaust survivors
20th-century Polish rabbis
Polish emigrants to the United States
People from Jasło
20th-century American rabbis
People from Brownsville, Brooklyn